The British Rail Class 312 alternating current (AC) electric multiple units (EMUs) were built between 1975 and 1978 for use on outer-suburban passenger services. It was the last class of multiple unit to be constructed with the British Rail Mark 2 bodyshell, as well as the last class of multiple unit to be built with slam doors in Britain. These features contributed to their relatively early withdrawal at 25–28 years old, compared with a typical EMU life expectancy of 30–40 years.

Description
The only significant difference between sub-classes was that the 312/1 units were also equipped to work on the 6.25 kV AC overhead electrification system used on parts of the Great Eastern Main Line and London, Tilbury and Southend line networks.

British Rail
As built, the 312/0 fleet were used on the newly electrified Great Northern outer suburban services from London King's Cross to Royston. The 312/1s were built for Great Eastern line services from London Liverpool Street. The four 312/2 units were mainly used to enhance local services between Birmingham New Street and Birmingham International, but were also used on other services in the West Midlands.

During the late 1980s, the class received an interior refurbishment that saw the wooden panel interiors covered with fascia panels, the removal of window blinds and other alterations. At the same time units lost their blue/grey livery (312/0) or all-over blue livery (312/1 and 312/2 as introduced) in favour of Network SouthEast (NSE) livery (312/0-1), whilst of the four 312/2 units, 312204 carried West Midlands Passenger Transport Executive yellow and blue livery and the others were dressed in the standard blue and grey, before their transfer to NSE.

At the same time, or soon after, units were reallocated. The Class 312/0 units moved to the Great Eastern Main Line following the arrival of a more modern  Class 317 fleet. The 312/1 subfleet consequently moved to the London, Tilbury and Southend line, displacing older Class 302 and 305 units. The section of 6.25 kV on the GEML had been converted to the now standard 25 kV, meaning the exclusive dual-voltage capability of this subfleet would continue to be useful, the line still being dual-voltage at the time.

The 312/2 units would also go to the Great Eastern, replaced by modified 310 units released by the delivery of Class 321/4 units in the West Midlands. These moves were complete by the end of the 1980s, and allocations remained broadly stable until privatisation and the period until withdrawal in 2003–04.

Post-privatisation
Upon privatisation, the fleet was divided between three franchises.

Central Trains
Central Trains inherited four units, 312725–728. These were primarily used on fast Birmingham New Street to Liverpool Lime Street services, and were painted in Regional Railways livery. Their stay with Central Trains did not last long and they were transferred to LTS Rail (since rebranded c2c) in 1996.

First Great Eastern
First Great Eastern inherited 24 units, 312701–724. These were used mainly on Colchester to Walton-on-the-Naze and Manningtree to Harwich services and London Liverpool Street to Ipswich and Clacton peak trains. In later years, two former LTS units, 312728/784, were acquired to replace accident-damaged units such as 312707, written off by an arson attack whilst stabled at Colchester Station on 11 March 2003.

In 2003, First Great Eastern acquired new Class 360 units to replace these trains. Units were gradually removed from traffic, and by March 2004 only three sets, 312718/721/723, remained in service. A farewell charter train operated on their previous routes using two of these units. The final sets were used on peak trains, and were withdrawn on 25 June 2004 after the return of the five Class 322 units which had been on hire to ScotRail.

With all sets on the London Liverpool Street to Southend service having been replaced by 321 units, the last service to survive east of Shenfield junction was the early morning 12 car service from Southminster to London, where 321 units could only operate in 8 car configuration.

LTS Rail (c2c)
c2c (operating the London, Tilbury and Southend franchise) inherited 21 units, 312729/730/781–799, later supplemented by the four former Central Trains units, 312725–728. These latter units were repainted in Network SouthEast livery, some of the last vehicles to be so treated.

The final units were withdrawn from service in 2003, having been replaced by new Class 357/2 "Electrostar" units. Two units were later transferred to First Great Eastern to supplement their fleet as detailed earlier.

Accidents and incidents

Preservation 
Vehicles 78037 and 71205 from unit 312792 have been preserved and were at Electric Railway Museum, Warwickshire.

Following the closure of the ERM, both vehicles moved to the Colne Valley Railway, Essex in March 2018, taking them back to their native operating area.

Fleet details
The table below illustrates the original formation, numbering and areas of use:

References

Sources

External links 
 

312
312
Train-related introductions in 1975
25 kV AC multiple units